Igor Igorevich Frolov (born 23 January 1990) is a Russian road cyclist, who currently rides for Russian amateur team Moscow Region.

Major results

2008
 9th Overall Tour de la Région de Lodz
2010
 1st Stage 5 Carpathia Couriers Paths
2011
 7th Memorial Oleg Dyachenko
2014
 1st Overall Friendship People North-Caucasus Stage Race
1st Stage 4 (ITT)
 5th Overall Grand Prix of Sochi
2015
 1st Stage 1 (TTT) Grand Prix of Adygeya
 1st Stage 4 (ITT) Friendship People North-Caucasus Stage Race
 3rd Hill-climb, National Road Championships
 3rd Overall Grand Prix of Sochi
1st Stage 1 (TTT)
2016
 1st  Hill-climb, National Road Championships
2017
 1st Overall Friendship People North-Caucasus Stage Race
 1st Stage 2 Ufa Stage Race
2018
 3rd Road race, National Road Championships
2019
 1st Overall Grand Prix of Sochi
1st Stage 1
 2nd Road race, National Road Championships
2020
 2nd Road race, National Road Championships
2021
 1st  Overall Five Rings of Moscow
1st  Points classification
1st Stage 1

References

External links

1990 births
Living people
Russian male cyclists
Sportspeople from Tula, Russia